Zietrisikite is a naturally occurring waxy hydrocarbon compound.  It is very similar to ozokerite and is found at Zietrisika, Moldavia.

References 

Hydrocarbons